This was the first edition of the tournament as part of the WTA 125K series.

Varvara Lepchenko won the title, defeating Jamie Loeb in the final, 7–6(7–4), 4–6, 6–4.

Seeds

Draw

Finals

Top half

Bottom half

External Links

Main Draw

LTP Women's Open - Singles
LTP Charleston Pro Tennis